This is a list of members of the Victorian Legislative Council between the elections of 4 June 1925 and 2 June 1928. As half of the Legislative Council's terms expired at each triennial election, half of these members were elected at the 1922 triennial election with terms expiring in 1928, while the other half were elected at the 1925 triennial election with terms expiring in 1931.

The Electoral Provinces Boundaries Act 1903 defined 17 Provinces with two members each for a total of 34 members.

Note the "Term in Office" refers to that members term(s) in the Council, not necessarily for that Province.

Sir Frank Clarke was President; William Edgar was Chairman of Committees; T. R. Gilchrist was Clerk of the Council.

 On 13 January 1928, Joseph Sternberg, MLC for Bendigo, died. He was not replaced until the general election in June 1928.

References

 Re-member (a database of all Victorian MPs since 1851). Parliament of Victoria.

Members of the Parliament of Victoria by term
20th-century Australian politicians